Daniel Erasmus (born 7 July 1973) is a Zimbabwean cricketer. He played 27 first-class matches for Mashonaland between 1992 and 1996.

See also
 List of Mashonaland first-class cricketers

References

External links
 

1973 births
Living people
Zimbabwean cricketers
Mashonaland cricketers
Sportspeople from Harare